The Florida Administrative Code (FAC) is the official compilation of the rules and regulations of Florida regulatory agencies.

See also 
 Florida Administrative Register
 Law of Florida

References

External links 
 Florida Administrative Code from the Florida Department of State

Florida law
United States state administrative codes